The 1909 University of Utah football team was an American football team that represented the University of Utah as an independent during the 1909 college football season. In its sixth and final season under head coach Joe Maddock, the team compiled a 6–1 record, shut out five of seven opponents, and outscored all opponents by a total of 180 to 19. The team was recognized as the Utah state champion, and played its home games at Cummings Field in Salt Lake City.

Schedule

References

University of Utah
Utah Utes football seasons
University of Utah football